Leisure Learning Unlimited, Inc. is a privately owned continuing-education firm in Houston, Texas, which after operating for nearly four decades, ceased to function normally during the first quarter of 2017. Established in 1979 by Ted Weisgal and Kathy Kamin, Leisure Learning Unlimited (LLU) offered non-credit courses for people interested in taking up new hobbies, getting exercise and recreation, enhancing their careers, and socializing. The face-to-face classes stopped and the online classes were supposed to be offered by a new business.

Office, main campus and external class locations 

Leisure Learning's main campus (and its offices and Computer Center) is in Southwest Houston at 6363 Richmond Avenue. Many LLU instructors convene classes at their businesses and homes, particularly the cooking and music instruction classes. Excursions such as hiking, biking, and kayaking, take place at outdoor venues.

Leisure Learning class schedule 

LLU prints and distributes its schedule every two and a half months. It is on display in approximately 1,000 locations across the city. The publication racks are usually located at the entrances of restaurants, retail stores, grocery stores, and nightclubs. Several county, municipal, and school system libraries also stock the schedules.

Variety of classes 

In a recent course schedule, LLU offered 1,129 sessions of 478 classes on a wide array of subjects, including arts and crafts; fine arts; book and film discussion; cooking and nutrition; do-it-yourself home and vehicle repair; social dancing; photography; computer skills; instrumental and vocal music; travel; relationship advice; business; financial planning; and sports, recreation and fitness.

Leisure Learning student base 

As of March 2009, over 11,000 Houston-area residents have taken 20 or more courses from LLU. Of those repeat students, more than 1,200 have taken 50 classes. The large student base and word-of-mouth promotion contribute to LLU's visibility in the greater Houston community.

References

External links 
 A detailed history of Leisure Learning Unlimited written by SSQQ Dance Center owner Rick Archer
 Houston Chronicle article containing information about Leisure Learning Unlimited

Continuing education
Education in Houston